Elections to West Lothian Council were held on 3 May 2007, the same day as the other Scottish local government elections and the Scottish Parliament general election. The election was the first one using nine new wards created as a result of the Local Governance (Scotland) Act 2004, each ward will elect three or four councillors using the single transferable vote system form of proportional representation. The new wards replace 32 single-member wards which used the plurality (first past the post) system of election. Councillors remained in post until 2012.

Election results

Ward results

External links
BBC West Lothian results
West Lothian council 2007 election information
Ward results from The Herald newspaper

2007 Scottish local elections
2007